Veeram is a 2016 Indian epic historical drama film written and directed by Jayaraj. It is an adaptation of William Shakespeare's play, Macbeth, and is the fifth installment in Jayaraj's Navarasa series. The film, which also takes inspirations from the Vadakkan Pattukal (Northern Ballads) of North Malabar region in Kerala tells the story of Chandu Chekavar (Kunal Kapoor), an infamous warrior in the 13th century North Malabar.

Veeram is simultaneously made in Malayalam, Hindi, and in English with the same title. Principal photography commenced on 5 January 2016 in Thiruvananthapuram, where it was mostly shot, with other locations being Agra and Aurangabad. The film premiered at the BRICS Film Festival on 2 September 2016 in New Delhi, and was released on 24 February 2017.

Cast
 Kunal Kapoor as Chandu Chekaver
 Shivajith Padmanabhan as Aromal Chekaver
 Himarsha Venkatsamy as Unniyarcha
 Satheesh Menon as Raman Chekaver (Kunhiraman)
 Shiyas Kareem as Warrior (killer)
 Ashraf Gurukkal as Kannappachekavar
 Ketaki Narayan as Kunjuneeli
 Divina Thakur as Kuttimani
 Aaran as Aringodar Chekaver
 Bilas Nair as Komappan
 Gopan Mavelikkara (Gopakumar) as Vazhunor
 Justin Antony 'Jetta' as Aromalunni
Monichan as Malayan
Atul as Paanan
Jayadeep.V.Nair as Chandappan

Production

Development
After the film Ottaal, Jayaraj announced in an interview in March 2015 that he is planning to adapt William Shakespeare's Macbeth and Fyodor Dostoyevsky's The Brothers Karamazov for a feature film. Jayaraj had earlier adapted two of Shakespeare plays Othello and Antony and Cleopatra into feature films in Malayalam. Veeram, an adaptation of Macbeth was officially announced by Jayaraj in October 2015. The announcement was held during a function in Doha, organised by the executives of Chandrakala Arts, a newly formed film production company based in Qatar, who are also the investors of Veeram. Jayaraj said, the film's story is set in the 13th century Kerala and will features newcomers as actors, and most of the technical crew will be from the American film industry. Apart from Malayalam, the film is also made in English and Hindi for attracting an international audience. The film was planned to start production in November 2015 for a mid-2016 release.

Pre-production
Pre-production underwent until early December 2015. Veeram is the fifth film in Jayaraj's Navarasa series, the story adapted from Macbeth will be set in North Malabar and Jayaraj also takes inspiration from Vadakkan Pattukal (Northern Ballads). The film will abundantly use the martial art, Kalarippayattu.

Jayaraj calls the film his dream project. After completing the screenplay and conceptualising a production plan, he put a newspaper advertisement in search of producers. Chandramohan D. Pilai, a Qatar-based banker and an old friend of Jayaraj, replied to the ad. In fact, almost thirty years ago, Pillai already had a discussion with Jayaraj about producing a film, and Jayaraj was interesting in directing it. The deal was finalised, after which Jayaraj invited him to India for further discussions about the film's production plans, which likely requires a high budget. Pillai formed the production company, Chandrakala Arts in India, for producing the film with collaboration from two of his friends, though they do not wanted to credit their names in the film. Jayaraj himself traveled to the United States in search of technical assistance for the film.

Jayaraj did not want to cast superstars or experienced actor for the film as he does not want to compromise his directorial freedom as star actors often demand alterations in the script to glamourise their characters. Audition for actors was conducted in three rounds, with the first one conducted in Mumbai in October 2015, and second round in Chennai, and third in Kerala. Over 4500 candidates participated in the audition.

Despite the search for a newcomer, Bollywood actor Kunal Kapoor was selected to portray the protagonist. He plays the role of Chandu Chekavar, an infamous warrior in the Vadakkan Pattukal (Northern Ballads) of North Malabar region in Kerala. Kapoor's name was confirmed in late December 2015. Preparing for the role, Kunal attended a Kalaripayattu training schedule in Mumbai, who was taught by a Gurukkal from Kollam in a strict schedule which started in October 2015. He also underwent weight training and increased  muscle weight for the role. Kapoor said, it is every actors wish to play Macbeth and he had a long time wish to do an action film, so when he was offered the role he immediately signed it. During preparation period, apart from his martial art training, he had a regular reading workshop with Jayaraj and also learned Malayalam. His character was reported to have a beard and a man-bun. Veeram is Kapoor's debut film in Malayalam cinema. Most of the other characters in the film were done by newcomers from Mumbai and Kerala.

Filming
Principal photography commenced on 5 January 2016 in Thiruvananthapuram, Kerala. The film is mostly based in the Southern region of India, the filming locations were in Thiruvananthapuram, Agra, and Aurangabad. Veeram was simultaneously made in Malayalam, Hindi and English. Kapoor's scenes were shot in such a way that they will first shoot it in Hindi, then the same scene will be re-shoot in English and finally in Malayalam, as he was most comfortable with Hindi and the least with Malayalam. The filming hours normally went up to 16 hours a day. The film was mostly shot in Thiruvananthapuram, some portions were shot in Ajanta and Ellora Caves in Aurangabad, Maharashtra and in Agra, Uttar Pradesh. The filming was completed in mid-April 2016. The film will not feature any songs, unlike other Indian films.

The film's stunt choreography was done by Allan Poppleton, Trefor Proud was make-up artist, music was composed by Jeff Rona, and film's colour grading was supervised by Jeff Olm. Poppleton researched on the martial art Kalaripayattu for the film for almost two months at various teaching centres. Along with the various Kalari movements, he incorporated his on style to adjust it to the camera angles. For the costumes and makeup, Trefor researched for several months. The costumes represent the clothes worn by 13th century warriors in North Malabar. Body paints and tattoos were also used to get a fierce look. The colours used resemble the ones used in various dance forms in Kerala, that including Kathakali. The film's soundtrack was an orchestral combination of traditional Maratha folk music. Veeram is the most expensive films made in Malayalam until date, made on a budget close to 35 crore (350 million).

Music
Former Hans Zimmer associate Jeff Rona, who debuted as an independent film composer with Ridley Scott's White Squall has composed and produced the film score. The film marks Rona's debut in Malayalam cinema and Bollywood.

Release
The film was initially planned as a mid-2016 release. Veeram was premiered as the opening film at the BRICS Film Festival on 2 September 2016 at the Siri Fort Auditorium in New Delhi, India. The film's theatrical release was on 24 February 2017. The movie was then released on Amazon Prime on January 17, 2022.

Reception
The film opened to brilliant reviews all over. Veeyen lauded the film as exceptionally good, and wrote that "it is no ordinary canvas that Jayaraj has mounted his epic film ‘Veeram’ on, and as such it evolves into an ambitious demonstration of an idea that amazingly blends two classic tales together. Atypical in conception and phenomenal in implementation, ‘Veeram’ presents you with one of the most memorable cinematographic experiences that you have witnessed ever in contemporary Malayalam cinema."

Even though the film opened to rave reviews, with some hailing this film as Malayalam cinema's Baahubali, Veeram was a box office failure.

References

External links
 
 

Films about royalty
2010s Malayalam-language films
2016 films
Indian historical drama films
2010s Hindi-language films
2016 war drama films
Indian epic films
Indian war drama films
Indian martial arts films
2010s historical drama films
Kalarippayattu films
Indian multilingual films
English-language Indian films
Films based on Macbeth
Films scored by Jeff Rona
Films set in the 13th century
Films based on Indian folklore
Films shot in Maharashtra
Films shot in Uttar Pradesh
Films shot in Agra
Films shot in Thiruvananthapuram
Films shot in Kerala
2016 martial arts films
2016 multilingual films